Diploschistella is a genus of fungi within the family Gomphillaceae.

References

Ostropales
Lichen genera
Ostropales genera
Taxa named by Edvard August Vainio